John William Delveaux (March 15, 1937 – May 13, 2020) was a Canadian football fullback and linebacker who played for the Winnipeg Blue Bombers from 1959 to 1964, a team which won the Grey Cup in 1959, 1961 and 1962.

Delveaux played college football at the University of Illinois at Urbana–Champaign and was their team captain. He joined the Blue Bombers in 1959 and played both offense and defense. In the 1961 CFL season, he replaced an injured Charlie Shepard as the punter and did a commendable job in the team's Grey Cup victory. In 1962, he became their regular punter up to his final year, averaging 42.1 yards per punt over 5 years. As a linebacker, he intercepted 9 balls in his career, 4 of which in 1962, and recovered 4 fumbles. Delveaux died on May 13, 2020.

References

1937 births
Players of Canadian football from Chicago
Winnipeg Blue Bombers players
2020 deaths
University of Illinois Urbana-Champaign alumni